Lac de Darbon is a lake in Haute-Savoie, France. Located at an elevation of 1813 m, its surface area is 2 ha.

Darbon

This is a remote area, reachable only by 4WD. The 'chalets' near the lake were burned down by German forces during WW2 as they were used by the resistance as the remote area was perfect for arms and ammunition dropped by the Allied forces.
These chalets were rebuilt / repaired by a group of local friends from a nearby village, in the 1980s and 1990s. They upkeep, maintain and uses them for Eco-conservation with great respect for the surrounding pristine nature, fauna and vistas.
The lake area is the home of numerous ibex, Alpine marmots, and snakes.